Malkapur  is a city and municipality in the Buldhana district of Maharashtra, India. Malkapur is one of the largest cotton producers in the area. In the British era, it was known as the "White gold of Vidarbha". Malkapur has a vast paper industry and the primary paper suppliers to Mumbai are in Malkapur. Malkapur has many Dal mills, and a major agricultural industry specializing in Mahyco and Ankur seeds, chemical plants, and a fruit ripening chamber. Malkapur is a well-known grain and cloth market due to its proximity to Madhya Pradesh. It is one of the major producers of red  chilli.

Demographics
According to the 2011 census, Malkapur Municipal Council has a population of 67,740. In which 34,693 are males and 33,047 females . Malkapur has an average literacy rate of 82%, higher than the national average of 75%. The male literacy is 89% and female literacy is 75%. In Malkapur, 20% of the population is under 6 years of age.

Transport
Malkapur is located on the Hajira - Kolkata National Highway 6, which is a part of the Asian Highway 46 from Kharagpur to Dhule.Malkapur railway station lies on the Howrah-Nagpur-Mumbai line. Malkapur bus station is on Buldhana road. A boat facility is also available at Nalganga river.

References

Cities and towns in Buldhana district
Talukas in Maharashtra